Gerhart Hecker (born 11 September 1933) is a Hungarian long-distance runner. He competed in the marathon at the 1960 Summer Olympics.

References

1933 births
Living people
Athletes (track and field) at the 1960 Summer Olympics
Hungarian male long-distance runners
Hungarian male marathon runners
Olympic athletes of Hungary
Athletes from Budapest
20th-century Hungarian people